Northumberland Street is a street in the City of Westminster.

Location
The street runs from Strand in the north to Northumberland Avenue in the south. On its east side it is joined by Corner House Street and Craven Passage. It is part pedestrianised in the section leading off the Strand.

History
Northumberland Street was originally known as Hartshorn Lane. The buildings in that lane were demolished to make way for Northumberland Street in the 1760s.

Dramatist Ben Jonson (c. 1572–1637) spent his youth in Hartshorn Lane and may have been born there.

Buildings
The Sherlock Holmes public house is located in the south of the street on the corner with Craven Passage.

The Royal Institution of Naval Architects is located at Nos. 8–9.

The offices of the Association of Teachers and Lecturers are at No. 7.

See also
Northumberland House

References

External links 

Streets in the City of Westminster